Gornje Livade may refer to:

 Gornje Livade, Novi Sad, a quarter of the city of Novi Sad, Serbia
 Gornje Livade, Banat, a small geographical area in south-eastern Banat, Serbia